Bordj Badji Mokhtar District is a district of Bordj Baji Mokhtar Province, Algeria. According to the 2008 census it has a population of 20,930.

Communes
The district is further divided into 2 communes:
Bordj Badji Mokhtar
Timiaouine

References

Districts of Adrar Province